was a  after Jōtoku and before Chōji. This period spanned the years from August 1099 through February 1104.

Change of Era
 January 24, 1099 : The new era name was created to mark an event or series of events. The previous era ended and the new one commenced in Jōtoku 3, on the 28th day of the 8th month of 1099.

Events of the Kōwa Era
 1099 (Kōwa 1, 6th month): Kampaku Fujiwara no Moromichi died at age 38; and Moromichi's son, Fujiwara no Tadazane took over his father's responsibilities.
 1100 (Kōwa 2): The dainagon, Fujiwara no Tadazane, is elevated to udaijin.
 1101 (Kōwa 3, 2nd month): The former kampaku, Fujiwara no Morozane, died at age 60.

Notes

References
 Brown, Delmer M. and Ichirō Ishida, eds. (1979).  Gukanshō: The Future and the Past. Berkeley: University of California Press. ;  OCLC 251325323
 Nussbaum, Louis-Frédéric and Käthe Roth. (2005).  Japan encyclopedia. Cambridge: Harvard University Press. ;  OCLC 58053128
 Titsingh, Isaac. (1834). Nihon Ōdai Ichiran; ou,  Annales des empereurs du Japon.  Paris: Royal Asiatic Society, Oriental Translation Fund of Great Britain and Ireland. OCLC 5850691
 Varley, H. Paul. (1980). A Chronicle of Gods and Sovereigns: Jinnō Shōtōki of Kitabatake Chikafusa''. New York: Columbia University Press. ;  OCLC 6042764

External links 
 National Diet Library, "The Japanese Calendar" -- historical overview plus illustrative images from library's collection

Japanese eras
11th century in Japan
12th century in Japan